AIC Limited was a Canadian mutual fund company which commenced operations in 1985, as Total Finance. AIC was purchased in 1987, by Michael Lee-Chin, Chairman. In May 2008, the company's total assets under management was just over $5.6 billion IFIC numbers. In October 2006, Jonathan Wellum was appointed Chief Executive Officer. AIC was acquired by Manulife in 2009.

AIC specialized in the financial services sector and is a strong believer in the use of leverage, they coined the term "upvest" to try to remove some of the stigma associated with the term leverage.

The firms motto was "Buy, Hold and Prosper", and reflects a belief in purchasing value stocks and holding them for the long term.

AIC also had a series of closed-end funds under the Copernican Capital banner.

See also
 List of mutual fund companies in Canada

References

External links
 Official site
 Official upvest site
 Closed ended funds site
 Lee Chin to focus on developing AIC as international company - October 8, 2006 (Jamaica Gleaner Newspaper)

Mutual fund companies of Canada
Financial services companies established in 1985
1985 establishments in Canada